Defence of Sevastopol is a 1911 historical war film about the Siege of Sevastopol during the Crimean War and one of the most important films in the history of Russian cinema and cinema in general. It was the first feature film made in the Russian Empire and it premiered on 26 October at the Livadia Palace of Tsar Nicolas II. It was also the first film in the world recorded using two cameras. The film was also notable for using special "sound effects" (gun and cannon fire) and for using the actual war veterans as consultants.

Film crew
 Directors and writers: Vasily Goncharov and Aleksandr Khanzhonkov
 Cinematographers: Louis Forestier and Aleksandr Ryllo
 Artist: V. Fester
 Composer: Georgiy Kozachenko
 Consultant: Polkovnik M. Lyakhov

Cast
 A. Bibikov — graf Eduard Totleben
 Pavel Biryukov
 B. Borisov
 Aleksandra Goncharova
 Borus Gorin-Goryainov
 Andrey Gromov — admiral Pavel Nakhimov
 Vladimir Maksimov
 Ivan Mozzhukhin — admiral Vladimir Kornilov
 Olga Petrova-Zvantseva — merchant (sutler)
 N. Semyonov — sailor Koshka

References

External links

 

1911 films
Russian silent feature films
Russian black-and-white films
Crimean War films
Films directed by Vasily Goncharov
Films of the Russian Empire
Articles containing video clips
1911 war films
Russian war films
Russian historical films
1910s historical films